Tim De Troyer (born 11 August 1990) is a Belgian former racing cyclist. He rode at the 2014 UCI Road World Championships.

Major results

2008
 1st Guido Reybrouck Classic
 2nd Gent–Menen
 3rd Grand Prix Bati-Metallo
2011
 1st Grand Prix Criquielion
2012
 2nd Road race, National Under-23 Road Championships
 4th De Vlaamse Pijl
 8th Circuit de Wallonie
 9th La Côte Picarde
2014
 1st  Mountains classification Three Days of De Panne
 2nd Grote Prijs Stad Zottegem
2015
 1st Tour du Finistère
 3rd Internationale Wielertrofee Jong Maar Moedig
2016
 4th Overall Le Triptyque des Monts et Châteaux

References

External links

1990 births
Living people
Belgian male cyclists
Sportspeople from Aalst, Belgium
Cyclists from East Flanders